No. 510 Squadron was a Royal Air Force transport and liaison aircraft squadron that operated during the Second World War.

History
During 1942 it was decided that 24 Squadron was too large and the internal communication flight became no. 510 Squadron on 15 October 1942 at RAF Hendon. The squadron inherited an assortment of light transport types to allow it fly communications and liaison flights within the United Kingdom.
On 8 April 1944, still at RAF Hendon, the squadron was disbanded when it was renamed to the Metropolitan Communications Squadron, inheriting the aircraft and code(s) of 510 squadron.

Aircraft operated

The Stampe SV.4 was "liberated" by two Belgian pilots and flown across the Channel from occupied Belgium in 1941.

Squadron bases

See also
List of Royal Air Force aircraft squadrons

References
Notes

Bibliography

Aircraft squadrons of the Royal Air Force in World War II
Military units and formations established in 1942
510 Squadron